The Voluntary Social Year in Germany and, in a much lesser dimension, in Austria, is a government-funded voluntary work program particularly for young adults. It can last between six and eighteen months. It can also be spent abroad.

Germany

History 
The voluntary social year (German: Freiwilliges Soziales Jahr / FSJ) developed from the "diaconical year" organized by the Protestant and Catholic Church the first time in 1954, the 100th anniversary of the Diakoniewerk in Germany. The appeal to volunteer was addressed to young women who would provide service to the sick and those in need of care.

In 1962 the "Philadelphic Service" (German: Philadelphischen Dienst) has been initiated by Gertrud Rückert. She wanted to offer a voluntary social year for female high school graduates before they start studying for personal and professional orientation. At that time it was a completely new concept and a forerunner of the voluntary social year, that was later legally anchored in Germany. On February 14, 1963, the government introduced a draft law to offer a voluntary social year in parliament, the Bundestag. The law finally came into force on April 1, 1964.

Until the suspension of conscription for military service and therefore of the alternative service in 2011 as well, the voluntary social year was also recognized as alternative to military service in Germany.

Legal basis

Duration 
A duration to volunteer in the FSJ is between 6 and 18 months maximum. In exceptional cases the service can last up to 24 months, if this is justified by a special educational concept. If a voluntary social year is initially completed for less than 18 months, it can be extended to 15 months (in the case of a deployment in Germany), with the consent of the provider of the FSJ. The voluntary social year can also be completed abroad.

The starting times are usually between August and October of each year. Some porters offer the option of lateral entry.

Training 
The providers of a voluntary social year are obliged to provide the volunteers with at least 25 training days during a 12-month service. Depending on the time spent in the voluntary service, it is also possible to complete more or fewer training days. According to the Voluntary Service Act, volunteers are obliged to take part in the training days.

Social security and retirement provision 
Volunteers of the FSJ receive full social insurance. According to Social Code IV, the agency (or the place of assignment) pays the full costs for social insurance (employee and employer shares). The time of the voluntary social year is taken into account for the pension fund (compulsory pension insurance) The volunteers have a similar legal status to apprentices.

New legislation
Since June 1, 2008, the legal regulations have been merged with those of the Voluntary Ecological Year in a new bill for Youth Voluntary Services.

Branches of the FSJ 
There are different areas of operations. The services are divided into different branches:
 FSJ im sozialen Bereich (FSJ for social caring)
 FSJ in der Kultur (FSJ for cultural engagement)
 FSJ im Sport (FSJ for sports)
 FSJ in der Politik: (FSJ in politics)
 FSJ in der Denkmalpflege (FJD) (FSJ for preservation of historical monuments)
 FSJ Schule (FSJ for schools)

Operational areas 
The operational areas for FSJ-volunteers are all social, charitable or of public utility:

 Services for people with disabilities
 Hospitals
 Nursing homes
Retirement homes
 Foster homes
 Preservation of historic monuments
 Ambulatory services
 Youth welfare services
 Church communities
 Emergency medical services
 Children homes

Volunteers in the FSJ 
The number of volunteers of the Voluntary Social Year:

Austria 
The voluntary social year (the German terms: Freiwilliges Sozialjahr and Freiwilliges Soziales Jahr are in use) in Austria is very similar to the FSJ in Germany. Since 1968 the FSJ is organized by the “Association for the Promotion of Voluntary Social Services” (German: Verein zur Förderung freiwilliger sozialer Dienste) and is legally regulated in the Volunteer bill. The association has its seat in Vienna and its secretariat in Linz. Regional offices are located in Graz, Vienna, Innsbruck and Salzburg.

Regular voluntary social year 
Young people can volunteer in the FSJ for ten to twelve months in a social institution in Austria. The areas of responsibilities are assistance for people with disabilities, for old people, children or young people or working with homeless people respectively. The working time of the volunteers is 34 hours per week. While there were around 300-400 FSJ volunteers in 2012, in 2020 about 1,100 volunteers were registered.

Due to the existing conscription for military service in the Austrian Armed Forces, the voluntary social year is an substitute to the regular alternative service, called Zivildienst, since 2016.

Special voluntary social year 

Similar to the "Special Alternative Civilian Service" (German: Außerordentlicher Zivildienst), during times of crisis or a state of emergency, men and women can again volunteer for a "special voluntary social year" (German: Außerordentliches Freiwilliges Soziales Jahr), if they already have completed a regular voluntary social year. This special FSH can last for a period of one to nine months. The hours of work, positions, pocket money and insurance correspond to the conditions of the regular FSJ. In 2020, due to the COVID-19 pandemic, the "special FSJ" has been activated and will last until December 31, 2020.

See also
European Solidarity Corps
Federal volunteers service
Voluntary ecological year
Volunteering

References

External links
 http://www.pro-fsj.de/

Society of Germany
Conscientious objection
Society of Austria
Volunteering